The 2013–14 Dutch Basketball League season was the 54th season of the Dutch Basketball League. The following ten squads participated.

BC Apollo

L: left during the season.

SPM Shoeters Den Bosch

Den Helder Kings

L: left during season.
A: acquired during season.

GasTerra Flames

A: acquired during season.
L: left during season.

Aris Leeuwarden

A: acquired during season.
L = left during the season.

Zorg en Zekerheid Leiden

L: left during season.
A: acquired during season.

Matrixx Magixx

A: acquired during season.

Rotterdam Basketbal College

A: acquired during season.

Maxxcom BSW

Landstede Basketbal

squads